Shaheed A.H.M Qamaruzzaman Central Park and Zoo is a public park as well as zoo in Rajshahi, Bangladesh. It is a popular recreation place for the citizens of the city. The park has a land area of 33 acres. It is named after A.H.M Qamaruzzaman, who was one of the national leader of Bangladesh.

History
During the British colonial period it was a horse racecourse at the bend of the river Padma. The area was abandoned for a long period after the British left. Abul Hasnat Muhammad Qamaruzzaman who was a local political leader at that time took initiative to transform the area into a park by Zilla Parishad. The park was inaugurated in 1972 which later handed over to Rajshahi City Corporation in 1996. The zoo inside the park was opened in 1983.

Flora and fauna
The park has wide varieties of trees. The zoo inside the park has many types of animals including Tiger, deer, crocodile, monkey, snakes. There are many bird species and also fish species in the lake of the park.

References

Rajshahi
Parks in Bangladesh
Zoos in Bangladesh
1972 establishments in Bangladesh
Zoos established in 1972